Alla Kudryavtseva and Anastasia Rodionova won the first edition of the tournament, defeating Sorana Cîrstea and Andreja Klepač in the final, 6–7(6–8), 6–2, [10–8].

Seeds

Draw

References 
 Draw

Tianjin Open - Doubles
Tianjin Open